Jordon Lewis Hall (born 23 March 1998), is an English professional footballer who plays as a centre back for Melbourne City.

Youth career
Hall spent the 2017–18 and 2018–19 seasons playing for the Western Sydney Wanderers Youth and Melbourne City Youth respectively. Hall made 9 appearances for the Wanderers in the 2017–18 Y-League season, including a 3–1 grand final victory against his future club, Melbourne City.

Club career

Green Gully (2019–21)
After the 2018–19 season, Hall joined Green Gully SC after being in Melbourne City's academy system. Hall spent two season at Green Gully making 17 appearances for the club.

Melbourne City (2021–present)
On 24 August 2021, Hall signed with Melbourne City on a two-year deal. Hall made his debut for the club on 15 January 2022, when he came off the bench in the 83rd minute for Connor Metcalfe in a 2-2 draw against Adelaide United. Hall also made two appearances for the club in the 2022 AFC Champions League. City went on to win the A-League Men premiership for the 2021–22 season.

On 7 October 2022, Hall made an appearance in the opening match for the 2022–23 A-League Men season in a grand final re-match from the previous season against Western United; coming on for Thomas Lam in the 65th minute. City went onto win the match 2–1.

References

External links

Living people
Australian soccer players
Association football defenders
Melbourne City FC players
National Premier Leagues players
A-League Men players
1998 births
Soccer players from Melbourne
English emigrants to Australia